Alvania fractospira is a species of minute sea snail, a marine gastropod mollusk or micromollusk in the family Rissoidae.

Distribution
This species occurs in the Adriatic Sea near Dubrovnik, Croatia.

It also occurs in the Mediterranean, for example, around Cyprus.  See Marine Molluscs from Cyprus: new data and checklist  (Ozturk, Buzzurro & Benli).

References

 Oberling, J.-J. (1970). Quelques espèces nouvelles de Gastropodes du bassin Méditerranéen. Naturhistorisches Museum Bern. Kleine Mitteilungen. 1: 1-7.
 Gofas, S.; Le Renard, J.; Bouchet, P. (2001). Mollusca. in: Costello, M.J. et al. (eds), European Register of Marine Species: a check-list of the marine species in Europe and a bibliography of guides to their identification. Patrimoines Naturels. 50: 180-213.
 Moolenbeek, R. G.; Hoenselaar, H. J.; Oliverio, M. (1991). The Rissoid species described by J.J. Oberling. Bollettino Malacologico. 27:107-120.
page(s): 113-114; fig. 5

Rissoidae
Gastropods described in 1970